WMRO (1560 AM, "Magic 1560") was a radio station licensed to and serving Gallatin, Tennessee. The station was locally owned by Scott, Leslie, and Sandra Bailey of Classic Broadcasting, Inc. The station's studios and transmitter facilities were located a half–mile north of downtown Gallatin.

Programming
The station was last branded as "Magic 1560" and aired the satellite-fed adult contemporary music format from Cumulus Media.  On Sundays, church services, religious programs, sunday afternoon gospel music, and local programming focusing on Gallatin area were aired. On September 12, 2014, the station changed its format from hot adult contemporary to a mainstream adult contemporary format.

History

The Second Thursday Corporation received the construction permit for a new AM radio station in Nashville in 1962. Originally assigned the call letters WSTH, WLVN signed on April 1, 1963, as "The Nashville Sound", focusing entirely on recordings made in the city. WLVN relaunched as full-service WWGM on September 25, 1964. The station broadcast with 10,000 watts during the daytime only, with a three tower directional pattern. Originally, the WWGM call sign stood for the Wonderful World of Good Music. Later on after a format change, the call sign stood for the Wonderful World of Gospel Music.

After nearly four years of operation as WWGM, the station filed for bankruptcy in 1968. Crawford Broadcasting bought the station at auction for $105,000 later that year—though it did not become the licensee until 1970—and said that if the equipment manufacturers that WWGM owed money would not make arrangements with it, the group would build a new facility. Second Thursday also held a construction permit for an FM station on 92.9 MHz, sold separately, that was finally built in 1976 as WZEZ, now WJXA.

According to FCC records, in 1974, Faye B. Lindsey began to work at the station, eventually working her way up to a management position; by 1981, she was the station's general manager. In September 1986, Dean A. Crawford Broadcasting Co. reached an agreement to sell WWGM to Lindsey Christian Broadcasting Company, consisting of Faye and her husband Rudy Lindsey. The deal was approved by the FCC on November 25, 1986, and the transaction was consummated on December 16, 1986.  Throughout this era, the station was identified as a religious-oriented radio station, playing "traditional Christian music."
In April 1993, Lindsey Christian Broadcasting Company reached an agreement to sell WWGM to Classic Broadcasting, Inc. The deal was approved by the FCC on October 25, 1993, and the transaction was consummated on October 28, 1993. The new owners, William E. "Bill", Sandra, and Scott Bailey had the FCC change the call letters to WMRO on November 9, 1993 and relocated the station to Gallatin. The new site was the former site of 1130 WAMG, Gallatin (now WYXE). The WMRO call letter sign had previously belonged to a station in Aurora, Illinois, for the previous 30 years (see below).

On Saturday Morning, February 19, 1994, with its new call sign of WMRO, the station signed on at 8 AM and began playing an Oldies Rock-n-Roll music format. Little Richard, Elvis Presley, The Beatles, Bobby Darin, The Spinners, Rolling Stones, and The Turtles were among some of the artist played. There was a slight mix of old disco music like the Bee Gees, Donna Summer, LTD (Jeffery Osborne), and Abba were played as well. Scott Bailey, then part owner of WMRO, signed on the station, and was the first DJ to hit the air that morning. William "Bill" and Sandra Bailey are the parents of Scott Bailey. All three were owners of WMRO. Former WQQK 92Q Program Director Jay Dubard got with the Baileys and gave WMRO its station moniker name, Magic 1560. 

On April 1, 2006, the station flipped to a Hot Adult Contemporary music format because of the area's changing demographics as a Nashville bedroom community and another station in the county switching to an oldies format. The last Rock-n-Roll Oldies song played was Wooly Bully from Sam The Sham and The Pharaohs. The first song played with WMRO's new Hot Adult Contemporary format was Let Love In by the Goo Goo Dolls. Owner/General Manager Scott Bailey made the format change that day at 5 PM. Despite a format change, WMRO retained its well known moniker name, Magic 1560, but adding a new slogan, "Today's Best Hits". 

In December 2006, majority control of Classic Broadcasting was transferred from William E. "Bill" Bailey to Timothy Scott Bailey. On February  7th, 2007, William E. "Bill" Bailey passed away, however with Scott Bailey as President and General Manager, with Leslie Bailey, (Scott's wife) Vice President, and Sandra Bailey (Scott's mother) Secretary, the three pushed on to keep WMRO going with serving the community and it's Hot Adult Contemporary Music Format, which gained popularity in the Gallatin/Sumner County Community. Scott Bailey was quoted by saying they were playing a music format that just wasn't done on AM Radio. A few area broadcasters who liked the previous Oldies Format mock Scott Bailey for WMRO's format change, but other broadcasters in the area praised Scott, Leslie, and Sandra Bailey for playing more of a "Hot Adult Contemporary" Hit Music format. One was Jack Williams, former owner of competitor WHIN Radio in Gallatin. Jack Williams was very supportive of the format change. In fact, Jack Williams is family related to Scott, Leslie, and Sandra Bailey.

In 2007, WMRO also aired a weekly program called "Music Business Radio", produced at the studios of WRLT (Lightning 100) in Nashville, that promotes local bands, artist and writers. Lightning 100 DJ Dan Buckley worked with WMRO Owner/General Manager Scott Bailey to air Music Business Radio on WMRO to a reach much larger audience.

On September 12, 2014 at 10 AM, the station changed format from Hot Adult Contemporary to Mainstream AC. WMRO kept its moniker name, slogan, and logo, "Magic 1560, Today's Best Hits" with its format change. The first song played on WMRO's new Mainstream AC Format was "I Love Rock-n-Roll" by Joan Jett and The Blackhearts.

Before buying WMRO, Scott Bailey was an air personality known as "Scott the Rock" at Nashville's WVOL (1470 AM) and WQQK (92.1 FM) known as 92Q, with a love for its Urban Contemporary Format. He did "short stints" at 103.3 WKDF, 880 WMDB, 88.1 WFSK in Nashville; 1270 WQKR, Portland, Tennessee; and 1570 WLBQ Morgantown, Kentucky. Scott Bailey began his radio career at WRVU-FM 91.1 at Vanderbilt University in Nashville, Tennessee, as a "Non Student" Volunteer in 1981, then to 88.5 WVCP at Volunteer State College taking radio courses from instructor Howard Esparvnik, at the same time working in the Commercial Radio Business in the Nashville Market. In January 2020, and after years of owning and operating WMRO, Scott Bailey retired from Terrestrial Radio after a bit over 40 years.

On January 8, 2020, long time Sunday Afternoon DJ on WMRO, Wayne Akins, had passed away after an extended illness. Wayne Akins was from Westmoreland, Tennessee.

WMRO's last days of operation
In the fall of 2018, the land and studio building on which WMRO's tower was located was sold by Classic Broadcasting. Classic Broadcasting could not pay the bank lein Citizens Bank of Lafayette, Tennessee had on the land and building only. Classic Broadcasting, under then President and General Manager, William E. "Bill" Bailey purchased the building, property and tower site on November 13, 1991, through an IRS Auction. It was the former site of 1130 WAMG (now WYXE). In 2018, the bank allowed Classic Broadcasting to sell the property and building only to pay off the lein. Classic Broadcasting (Scott, Leslie, and Sandra Bailey) sold the building and land to a private individual. During this time, Classic Broadcasting's Consultant Engineer, James A. (Jim) Turvaville filed and applied for WMRO to have "Special Temporary Authority" to operate at 200 watts as a daytime–only station with a long wire antenna from Scott and Leslie Bailey's home. In a letter dated August 31, 2019, Scott Bailey returned WMRO's license to the FCC; the FCC cancelled the station's license on August 28, 2019. During the last two hours WMRO was on, Scott Bailey dropped the Adult Contemporary Format, went live playing Classic Rock with Classic R&B of the 70s and 80s. The last song played on WMRO according to Scott Bailey was "Slow Ride" by Foghat. After the song ended, he shut the transmitter off.

Previous callsign use
The WMRO call letters were originally assigned to Aurora, Illinois. WMRO existed from 1938 until 1989 (now WBIG). Sister WMRO-FM signed on in 1965 (now WLEY-FM).

References

External links
FCC Station Search Details: DWMRO (Facility ID: 11749)
FCC History Cards for WMRO (covering 1960-1979 as WSTH / WLVN / WWGM)

MRO
Hot adult contemporary radio stations in the United States
Radio stations established in 1963
Radio stations disestablished in 2019
Sumner County, Tennessee
Defunct radio stations in the United States
1964 establishments in Tennessee
2019 disestablishments in Tennessee
MRO